Kostas Nestoridis (born 15 March 1930) is a Greek former professional footballer, who played as a forward and a former manager. He is amongst the best players in the history of AEK Athens and one of the greatest ever players and scorers in Greek football.

Early life
Κostas Nestoridis was born on 15 March 1930 in Drama and was the youngest of three children of the Pontian Greek Giorgos and Kyriaki who arrived in Thrace as refugees after the Asia Minor disaster. Him and his simblings, Christos and Nopi, experienced intensely the financial misery and the struggles of the refugee life during their childhood. The work difficulties that his parents repeatedly faced, affected the young Nestoridis and were several times the criteria for any decisions during his football career. Nestoridis traveled from the dirt roads of Drama, to the fields of Kallithea, where his family was forced to move in search of work and then to the fields of Preveza, where they took refuge during The Occupation. There, his amazing talent in football charmed the crowds. Of course, enacting with football which he loved, always took second place as the need for assistance in the family finances came first, something that forced Nestoridis to work from a young age as a polisher, cigarette seller, shoemaker assistant and shepherd in his days at Preveza. After the end of the World War II, the return and resettlement of the family in Kallithea marked his most active involvement with football. In his neighborhood there was an independent club called PAO Kallitheas. They were not a recognizable team, but they provided a football kit and lemonade at the half time for their players, things that almost considered as luxury for the then standards of the young Nestoridis. His debut which was marked by scoring five goals began to weave the legend around his name. The legend did not take long to cross the narrow borders of the post-war Kallithea and reached the ears of Kostas Negrepontis, who was looking for a partner to Kleanthis Maropoulos in the offense of AEK Athens. One Sunday afternoon in Kallithea, Negrepontis, impressed by his dribbling skills and shooting technique, did not hesitate and invited Nestoridis to Nea Filadelfeia for a tryout. AEK's officials were impressed by his talent, but did not ask him to sign a sport's card and responded to his persistent calls for work with some vague promises of appointment to the Water Company. After about a month, where nothing came out, Nestoridis left AEK and football training, giving priority in finding a solution to his intense livelihood problem.

Club career

Early years
Nestoridis made his next step in his football career on a night in 1946, when his neighbor and friend, Kostas Sotiriadis, who was playing for Panionios, met him in Kallithea Square and suggested that he visit Nea Smyrni for another tryout. There, the coach Roussopoulos, having received information from Sotiriadis and impressed by his abilities, made him sign a sport's card, including him in the roster of Panionios. His urgent need for daily work as a cigarette retailer did not allow him to continue training with Panionios. He occasionally played football in his neighborhood until Karamalengos, the owner of the factory "Indiana" and a member of the Hellas Moschato, heard about him. He offered Nestoridis a steady job in his business and offered him to sign in his team. The young Nestoridis, seeing that his two big dreams, the steady job and football, were being materialized at the same time, did not hesitate to sign a fake sport's card under the name "Brinzos", as was the nickname of his brother, Christos and started playing in Hellas Moschato. The team became champions of their category in Piraeus Football Clubs Association, with Nestoridis scoring 48 goals and becoming their star player. He played for the club from Moschato until 1948. His career there would end ingloriously, as before the crucial match for the championship against Palia Kokkinia begun, a rival fan recognized Nestoridis and started shouting him with his real name. The officials of Hellas, fearing the revelation of forgery and punishment, did not use him, resulting in the 2–1 defeat and the loss of the championship. Their subsequent efforts to secure a free transfer of Nestoridis from Panionios were also fruitless.

Panionios
Nestoridis stayed for the first time in his career out of football competitions for a year and in 1949 he decided to join Panionios. There, at last he got the chance to play under Negrepontis, who was the coach at the time and they formed a strong friendship. He wore the blue-red jersey for 7 years and in 63 appearances he scored 26 goals, winning the top scorer award in Athens Football Clubs Association with 7 goals in 1951. At the same season, he had scored and starred in the victory of Panionios by 1–2 against AEK Athens in Nea Filadelfeia. Nevertheless, Nestoridis did not spend beautiful days at Panionios. The "cliques" of the older players considered him a "foreigner" and did not miss the opportunity to fight him, while from the side of the management he was treated simply as a product, that at some point would fill the club's coffers by transferring to one of the big clubs of POK.

AEK Athens
In 1955, AEK Athens organized a "Solidarity Cup" with the earnings of the tournament going for the completion of the projects in their stadium. Panionios participated in the tournament and after its end, their management put unbearable pressure on Nestoridis to transfer at Olympiacos or Panathinaikos. He categorically denied and faithful to his refugee origins signed for AEK without the consent of Panionios, with the actions of the vice-president of AEK, Vasilis Sevastakis. He was punished by the HFF with a two-year ban from the competitive activities. During that period Nestoridis was boiling, with the unique happy moments being his marriage to his beloved wife, Eleni and the birth of their son. The end of his punishment and his debut with the yellow-black jersey came in September 1957. His arrival at AEK marked a period of renewal for the club. The managerial duo of the former players Tzanetis and Negrepontis took charge of the team's renewal with the likes of Maropoulos, Delavinias, Arvanitis passing the torch to the younger generation of Serafidis, Stamatiadis and Poulis, with Kanakis being the "connecting spot".

"Captain Nestoras", as he was called, immediately established himself at the club and it didn't take him long enough to become a star player domestically. On the eve of a derby against Olympiacos, a photo was published, where Nestoridis was showing the up-right corner of the goalposts of Savvas Theodoridis and saying that if AEK took the kick-off of the match, he would send the ball in that corner, from the first minute. The next day, immediately with the kick-off, Nestoridis scored a goal in the corner he had indicated in the photo. In 1960, Nice and the Essen wanted to sign him, but he refused.

He scored the first hat-trick in the history of the first division on 6 December 1959 in an away match against Panegialios. On 7 March 1961, the administration of AEK imposed a one-month ban on him, because in the match against Panionios, he showed unsportsmanlike behavior towards his colleagues and the referee, but eventually took back their decision. He is the only player to become the top scorer of the Greek championship 5 times in a row. He is one of only three players in the history of AEK who managed to score 5 goals in a single league match which he achieved on 2 June 1963 against Iraklis. He was the scorer of the first goal of AEK in the UEFA competitions, on 18 September 1963 in a heavy 7–2 defeat against Monaco, for the European Cup. Until today he remains one of the club's highest scoring players, widely regarded as one of the greatest players to ever play for the yellow-blacks. He and another legend of the AEK, Mimis Papaioannou, formed one of the club's most formidable goalscoring partnerships. In the 8 seasons he played for AEK, he was always the top scorer of the team with the exception of 1964, when Papaioannou surpassed him. He had scored 13 times with a direct corner kick, one of them being one of the goals the 3–3 in the play-off match against Panathinaikos on 23 June 1963, which won the title for AEK after 23 years and Nestoridis his only Greek Championship of his career. He also won with AEK a Greek Cup in 1964. In the summer of 1965, Nestoridis took the decision to leave the club, but the possible departure of Papaioannou made him reconsider his decision and stayed to the double-headed eagle for one more season, despite his advanced age.

South Melbourne Hellas
In the summer of 1966, Nestoridis left AEK after 11 years of presence and being constantly in search of a better life and a more complete professional rehabilitation he moved in Australia and signed for the expatriate South Melbourne Hellas, as a player–coach. Although being at the age of 36, in 1966 he managed to become the top scorer of the state championship of Victoria with 21 goals and helped his team to win the title. In all the stadiums that he played, there was always a crowd of the people of the Greek community, as well as Australians, who flocked to watch him. The following year he returned to Greece to end his career at AEK, but was rejected by the then administration, due to his advanced age. He returned to Australia and Hellas Melbourne and scored another 12 goals with their jersey, this time finishing in 4th place in the league.

Return to Greece and retirement
In 1967 Nestoridis returned permanently to Greece and played for Vyzas Megara. Later in the season, he looked for a club and trained successively in Egaleo, Panionios and Ionikos. In February 1968, he signed as a player-coach for Aias Salamina, where he played in the second division. He debuted in a 2–1 away defeat against PAS Giannina on 3 March 1968 and he scored his first goal in the match against AO Chania in 2–1 home win on 31 March 1968. He remained until 20 April, where he resigned, thus ending his great career.

International career
In 1950 Nestoridis volunteered for the Air Force to play for the Greek Military team, where started scoring a lot of goals and participated in the CISM Football Cup. At the end of his 2-year term, he declared another four years as recalled and remained in the army for a total of 6 years. However, in a match with against the Italian Military team in 1956, a political issue arose about how an ordinary soldier without being an officer participated in the Military team for so many years. He was then offered a job in the Air Force, but he refused and withdrew from the Military team.

Nestoridis played with Greece a total of 17 times: 2 as a player of Panionios and 15 as a player of AEK Athens, scoring 3 goals. The number of his appearances was very little for a player of his level, as he did not have good relations with the respective selectors of the national team. He made his debut in the blue and white jersey on 14 October 1951.

Managerial career

After his playing career was over, Nestoridis officially begun his coaching career passing from the benches of various clubs such as Paniliakos and Kallithea, among others. In 1981 AEK Athens were in the midst of radical changes, as the great Loukas Barlos left the club, with the ownership passing onto the hands of Andreas Zafiropoulos. At the same time, Miltos Papapostolou was removed from the technical leadership which was assigned to Hans Tilkowski. The complete ignorance of the German regarding the Greek reality required the placement of an assistant next to him, with excellent knowledge and experience from the Greek football as well as the club itself, which AEK found in the person of Nestoridis. The course of the team was disappointing and after 7 wins, 6 draws and 4 defeats that left them behind in the standings, Tilkowski was sacked and replaced by the winner of the 1978 Double Zlatko Čajkovski. Nestoridis remained in the position of assistant of the new coach, being the connecting link between the previous and the current technical leadership, while also handling the situation in the team's locker rooms. The Čajkovski-Nestoridis duo somewhat fixed the situation by bringing AEK eventually in 4th place with 45 points, just 5 points from the top, however, the return of Čik at the wheel was nothing similar to his first term. In the summer of 1982, AEK were being prepared by "Čik-Nestoras" duo for the upcoming season, while the owner Zafiropoulos placed Michalis Arkadis as the club's president. The situation in the team was becoming more and more strange, as the communication between the technical leadership, the president and the major shareholder was becoming more confusing and Čajkovski showed that his advanced age made him lose any ambition for the team. In all this confusion, Nestoridis tried to do what he could by maintaining the necessary balances within the team. On 9 January 1983 the team faced a home defeat against OFI by 2–3 while the memory of the 5-goal defeat at the hands of PAOK in Toumba Stadium 3 games ago was still fresh. Everyone's indignation for Čik was obvious and he was removed, with Nestoridis taking over the technical leadership, as an interim as it turned out, since after about forty days Helmut Senekowitsch was hired. Nestoridis, having made 3 wins and 2 draws in the away matches against Iraklis and PAS Giannina, delivered the club second with a little distance from the top, while he felt rather sidelined from the hiriging of the Austrian manager and temporarily resigned from the technical staff. The following summer, there were a series of reshuffles in the long-suffering AEK as the major shareholder Zafiropoulos assigned the management to the Teris Panagidis - Dimitris Roussakis duo, with the former being in charge. The Cypriot businessman, connoisseur and fan of English football immediately hired the British John Barnwell as a coach. Barnwell stayed on the yellow-black bench for just 12 games and the recently fired Senekowitsch was called as his replacement. The second spell of "Seki" lasted for only 8 games in which the summary was 3 defeats, 3 draws and just 2 wins. Thus, after the two consecutive home draws, with the Apollons of Athens and Thessaloniki, the cooperation with the Austrian was terminated and Nestoridis was called to take action in the technical leadership of the club. He remained on the team's bench until the summer of 1983 and achieving 5 wins, 1 draw and 4 defeats, AEK finished in 7th place, recording one of their worst appearances in the Championship.

After football
In June 2017 Nestoridis opened his football academies, under the name Nestoras FC. His wax figure is in the new Agia Sophia Stadium museum with other wax effigies of people who have connected their name with AEK from various positions. His name also is honoured on one of the four pillars of the Stadum, alongside other important figures of the club's history such as Stelios Serafeidis, Mimis Papaioannou and Thomas Mavros.

Personal life
Nestoridis lives in Kallithea with his wife, Eleni and their son, Giorgos, maintains a Pro-Po business. He had health problems and now avoids publicity. On 16 March 2022 he was tested positive for COVID-19 and was hospitalized at Sotiria General Hospital, from where he tried to escape, but a few days later he recovered and got out 5 days later.

Style of play
 From a young age Nestoridis was gifted with an innate and unrepeatable talent, that of absolute "communication" with the ball. As a little boy, without being introduced or taught anything, Nestoridis showed from the beginning that there was a magical relationship between the ball and himself, with his magic touch. Those who saw Nestoridis in action had something to say about his elaborate actions. They talked about a balancing craftsman who acrobatically leaned on one of his legs and with bursts of speed and waist fractures disoriented any opponent who aspired to stop him. When the time came for the execution, he was unbeatable. The ball seemed to obediently follow the course ordered by Nestoridis, drawing tracks inconceivable to the common sense. He was a specialist in free-kicks and corner kicks, having scored 17 goals from direct corner kicks.

He used to announce the way he would maneuver and send the ball with the final shot. And it was verified to such an extent that it "forced" the fan of Olympiacos and great laïko musician, Vangelis Perpiniadis to write and sing the success of the time: "And like Nestoridis, no one will be, to say where the ball will be sent.”.

Career statistics

Club
{| class="wikitable" style="text-align:center"
|-
! colspan=3 | Club performance
! colspan=2 | League
! colspan=2 | Regional
! colspan=2 | Cup
! colspan=2 | Continental
! colspan=2 | Total
|-
! Season !! Club !! League
! Apps !! Goals
! Apps !! Goals
! Apps !! Goals
! Apps !! Goals
! Apps !! Goals
|-
|-
! colspan=3 | Greece
! colspan=2 | League
! colspan=2 | AFCA League
! colspan=2 | Greek Cup
! colspan=2 | Europe
! colspan=2 | Total
|-
|1948–49
|rowspan=7|Panionios
|rowspan=11|Panhellenic Championship
|0||0||4||2||0||0||0||0||4||2
|-
|1949–50
|0||0||14||4||1||1||0||0||15||5
|-
|1950–51
|3||0||9||7||2||0||0||0||14||7
|-
|1951–52
|0||0||10||4||7||1||0||0||17||5
|-
|1952–53
|0||0||8||5||2||0||0||0||10||5
|-
|1953–54
|0||0||10||3||4||3||0||0||14||6
|-
|1954–55
|0||0||5||1||3||3||0||0||8||4
|-
|1955–56
|rowspan=11|AEK Athens
|0||0||0||0||0||0||0||0||0||0
|-
|1956–57
|0||0||0||0||0||0||0||0||0||0
|-
|1957–58
|22||11||11||8||4||2||0||0||37||21
|-
|1958–59
|18||21||8||4||5||1||0||0||31||26
|-
|1959–60
|rowspan=7|Alpha Ethniki
|28||32||0||0||6||10||0||0||34||42
|-
|1960–61
|28||27||0||0||5||13||4||4||37||44
|-
|1961–62
|29||29||0||0||1||0||0||0||30||29
|-
|1962–63
|30||24||0||0||3||4||0||0||33||28
|-
|1963–64
|24||10||0||0||3||4||2||1||29||15
|-
|1964–65
|26||17||0||0||2||2||2||1||30||20
|-
|1965–66
|3||1||0||0||0||0||0||0||3||1
|-
! colspan=3 | Australia
! colspan=4 | League
! colspan=4 | Australia Cup
! colspan=2 | Total
|-
|1966
|rowspan=2|South Melbourne Hellas
|rowspan=2|Victorian State League
|??||21||colspan=2|—||0||0||colspan=2|—||??||21
|-
|1967
|??||12||colspan=2|—||0||0||colspan=2|—||??||11
|-
! colspan=3 | Greece
! colspan=2 | League
! colspan=2 | AFCA League
! colspan=2 | Greek Cup
! colspan=2 | Europe
! colspan=2 | Total
|-
|1967–68
|Vyzas
|Alpha Ethniki
|2||0||0||0||0||0||0||0||2||0
|-
|1967–68
|Aias Salamina
|Beta Ethniki
|7||2||0||0||0||0||0||0||7||2
|-
! colspan=3 | Career total
!220||207||79||38||48||44||8||6||355||295

 a.  Also includes the games for the Balkans Cup.

 b.  Also includes the games for the play-off matches.

International

Summary

Honours

AEK Athens
Alpha Ethniki: 1962–63
Greek Cup: 1963–64

South Melbourne
Victorian State League: 1966

Individual
Greek Championship top scorer: 1958–59, 1959–60, 1960–61 1961–62, 1962–63
Greek Cup top scorer: 1959–60, 1960–61
Victorian State League top scorer: 1966

Records
First player to score 5 goals in a single Greek league match. He scored all the goals for his team in the 5–0 at home against Iraklis on 2 June 1963.
Most Greek championship top scorer awards: 5 (from 1959 to 1963, shared with Antonis Antoniadis)
Most consecutive Greek championship top scorer awards: 5 (from 1959 to 1963)

References

External links

1930 births
Living people
Greek footballers
Greece international footballers
Greek expatriate footballers
AEK Athens F.C. players
AEK Athens F.C. managers
South Melbourne FC players
Greek football managers
Panionios F.C. players
Vyzas F.C. players
Super League Greece players
Expatriate soccer players in Australia
South Melbourne FC managers
Association football forwards
Footballers from Drama, Greece